Mazeppa is a symphonic poem (German: Symphonische Dichtung) composed by Franz Liszt between the years 1851 to 1854 for orchestra. Mazeppa, S. 100, is the sixth in the cycle of twelve symphonic poems written during Liszt's time in Weimar, however a thirteenth composition was added to his collection in 1882. Mazeppa is based on the poem of the same title written by Victor Hugo in 1829. The work premiered at the Court Theatre in Weimar on April 16, 1854.

History 
At the age of fifteen (1826), Liszt published twelve piano pieces titled Étude en 48 exercises dans les tons majeur et mineurs. In 1838, he revisited these compositions and republished the collection with a new title, 24 Grandes études. Seven years later (1840), Liszt reworked the fourth étude and titled it Mazeppa. This reimagined étude was reworked to express the elements of Victor Hugo's poem from the 1829 collection Les Orientales. Mazeppa was reworked for a final time in 1851 and the new version was given the title Transcendental Étude No. 4. The final version of the piano étude led to the orchestrated symphonic poem Mazeppa.

Program 
Mazeppa was first written as an epic poem by Lord Byron in 1818, however, Liszt's Mazeppa is based upon a much shorter account written by Victor Hugo in 1829 published within a collection of poems entitled Les Orientales. Both Mazeppa writings are based on the life of Ivan Stepanovich Mazepa-Koledinsky (c. 1632–1709) and Hugo's poem is included in Listz's original manuscript.

Hugo's poem introduces Mazeppa as a Ukrainian nobleman who became a page at the court of John Casimir, King of Poland. Due to a love affair with the wife of a Podolian count, Mazeppa was punished and tied naked onto a wild horse that was violently heading toward Ukraine. The horse collapsed in death and Mazeppa was saved by Ukrainian Cossacks who then named him as their leader. Under his leadership, the Ukrainian men gained major victory in the battlefield.

Instrumentation 
The orchestra consists of piccolo, two flutes, two oboes, English horn, two clarinets, bass clarinet, three bassoons, four French horns, three trumpets, three trombones, tuba, timpani, bass drum, cymbals, triangle, and strings.

Form and Analysis 
The symphonic poem is divided into two distinct sections: Mazeppa's ride (Section 1) and the March (Section 2). According to Liszt, it is possible to play the march, section two, without section one, the ride, as it was the material first composed for the piano piece.

Mazeppa begins similarly to the piano version, but it has an extended introduction. The composer follows Hugo's narrative, describing the hero's journey through the vast steppes in the first movement. The melodies within symphonic poems are of the highest importance, as they express the emotions experienced by the characters within the story. The string section plays the main theme, which is inserted below.

This them is expounded upon throughout the work as Mazeppa, the character, experiences differing situations and emotions. This theme is transformed and distorted with six strokes of the timpani that evoke the fall of the rider at the end of section one, the ride. After a silence, strings, bassoon and horn soloists express astonishment of the injured, raised by the trumpets at Allegro Marziale. Mazeppa and his cossacks are placed in front of the army (a march is heard) and the return of the hero's theme signifies his end in glory.

Criticism 
Mazeppa evoked great criticism compared to the other symphonic poems of Liszt. The , an Austrian magazine on music, published this review after a performance in Leipzig on April 16, 1857:
Mazeppa was but faintly applauded. After hearing both of these much- talked-of works with our own ears, we, also, are cured of the erroneous idea that they are something special, something we never heard before, something immense. They may be listened to very well with other things. Berlioz has made my head ache much more. People, however, must not allow themselves to be persuaded that they are music with any claims to importance, or destined to enjoy a great future.

References 
Notes

Sources

Further reading

External links 
 

Symphonic poems by Franz Liszt
1851 compositions
Cultural depictions of Ivan Mazepa